Zelenyi Hai (meaning "green grove") may refer to several places in Ukraine:

Cherkasy Oblast
Zelenyi Hai, Cherkasy Oblast, a village in Uman Raion

Chernihiv Oblast
Zelenyi Hai, Novhorod-Siverskyi Raion, a village in Novhorod-Siverskyi Raion
Zelenyi Hai, Novhorod-Siverskyi Raion, Ponornytsia Hromada, a village in Ponornytsia Hromada, Novhorod-Siverskyi Raion
Zelenyi Hai, Talalaivka Raion, a village in Pryluky Raion

Chernivtsi Oblast
Zelenyi Hai, Chernivtsi Oblast, a village in Chernivtsi Raion

Dnipropetrovsk Oblast
Zelenyi Hai, Dnipropetrovsk Raion, a village in Dnipropetrovsk Raion
Zelenyi Hai, Kryvyi Rih Raion, a village in Kryvyi Rih Raion
Zelenyi Hai, Kryvyi Rih Raion, Shyroke Hromada, a village in Shyroke Hromada, Kryvyi Rih Raion
Zelenyi Hai, Sofiivka Hromada, Kryvyi Rih Raion, a village in Kryvyi Rih Raion.
Zelenyi Hai (Brahynivka), Synelnykove Raion, a village in Brahynivka selsoviet, Synelnykove Raion
Zelenyi Hai (Ukrainske), Synelnykove Raion, a village in Ukrainske selsoviet, Synelnykove Raion
Zelenyi Hai, Synelnykove Raion, a village in Synelnykove Raion
Zelenyi Hai, Nikopol Raion, a village in Nikopol Raion
Zelenyi Hai (Pysmenne), Synelnykove Raion, a village in Pysmenne selsoviet, Synelnykove Raion
Zelenyi Hai (Zelenyi Hai), Synelnykove Raion, a village in Zelenyi Hai selsoviet, Synelnykove Raion

Donetsk Oblast
Zelenyi Hai, Boykivske Raion, a village in Boykivske Raion
Zelenyi Hai, Komar rural hromada, Volnovakha Raion, Donetsk Oblast, a village in Komar rural hromada, Volnovakha Raion
Zelenyi Hai, Volnovakha urban hromada, Volnovakha Raion, Donetsk Oblast, a village in Volnovakha urban hromada, Volnovakha Raion

Kherson Oblast
Zelenyi Hai, Beryslav Raion, Kherson Oblast, a village in Beryslav Raion
Zelenyi Hai, Henichesk Raion, Kherson Oblast, a village in Henichesk Raion
Zelenyi Hai, Kherson Raion, Kherson Oblast, a village in Kherson Raion

Kharkiv Oblast
Zelenyi Hai, Izium Raion, Kharkiv Oblast, a village in Izium Raion
Zelenyi Hai, Lozova Raion, Kharkiv Oblast, a village in Lozova Raion
Zelenyi Hai, Kupiansk Raion, Kharkiv Oblast, a village in Kupiansk Raion

Kirovohrad Oblast
Zelenyi Hai, Kropyvnytskyi Raion, a village in Kropyvnytskyi Raion
Zelenyi Hai, Kirovohrad Raion, a village in Kirovohrad Raion
Zelenyi Hai, Oleksandriia Raion, a village in Oleksandriia Raion
Zelenyi Hai, Petrove Settlement Hromada, Oleksandriia Raion, a village in Oleksandriia Raion
Zelenyi Hai, Subbotsi Rural hromada, Kropyvnytskyi Raion, a village in Subbotsi Rural hromada, Kropyvnytskyi Raion

Luhansk Oblast
Zelenyi Hai, Luhansk Oblast, a village in Antratsyt Raion

Lviv Oblast
Zelenyi Hai, Lviv Oblast, a village in Lviv Raion

Mykolaiv Oblast
Zelenyi Hai (Kashpero-Mykolaivka), Bashtanka Raion, a village in Kashpero-Mykolaivka selsoviet, Bashtanka Raion
Zelenyi Hai (Novoserhiyivka), Bashtanka Raion, a village in Novoserhiyivka selsoviet, Bashtanka Raion
Zelenyi Hai, Volodymyrivka rural Hromada, Bashtanka Raion, a village in Volodymyrivka rural Hromada, Bashtanka Raion
Zelenyi Hai, Mykolaiv Raion, a village in Mykolaiv Raion
Zelenyi Hai, Shevchenkove rural Hromada, Mykolaiv Raion, a village in Mykolaiv Raion
Zelenyi Hai, Voznesensk Raion, a village in Voznesensk Raion

Odesa Oblast
Zelenyi Hai, Odesa Oblast, a village in Podilsk Raion

Rivne Oblast
Zelenyi Hai, Rivne Oblast, a village in Dubno Raion

Sumy Oblast
Zelenyi Hai, Romny Raion, a village in Romny Raion
Zelenyi Hai, Lebedyn urban Hromada, Sumy Raion, a village in Lebedyn urban Hromada, Sumy Raion
Zelenyi Hai, Sumy Raion, a village in Sumy Raion

Ternopil Oblast
Zelenyi Hai, Ternopil Oblast, a village in Chortkiv Raion

Zaporizhia Oblast
Zelenyi Hai, Poholy Raion, a village in Polohy Raion
Zelenyi Hai, Poholy Raion, a village in Polohy Raion
Zelenyi Hai, Poholy Raion, a village in Poholy Raion
Zelenyi Hai, Vasylivka Raion, a village in Vasylivka Raion
Zelenyi Hai, Melitopol Raion, a village in Melitopol Raion
Zelenyi Hai, Zaporizhzhia Raion, a village in Zaporizhzhia Raion

Zhytomyr Oblast
Zelenyi Hai, Novohrad-Volynskyi Raion, a village in Novohrad-Volynskyi Raion
Zelenyi Hai, Korosten Raion, a village in Korosten Raion